The Avery Fisher Prize is an award given to American musicians for outstanding achievement in classical music.  Founded by philanthropist Avery Fisher in 1974, it is regarded as one of the most significant awards for American instrumentalists. The award is decided by members of the Avery Fisher Artist Program, which is administered by the Lincoln Center for the Performing Arts; artists do not apply, and nominations are secret. Initially accompanied by an award of US$10,000, recent years have seen the cash allotment increase to US$75,000 and then US$100,000.

List of winners
The list below includes only those individuals who have won the Avery Fisher Prize.  It does not include awardees of the Avery Fisher Career Grant or the Avery Fisher Recital Award. The Avery Fisher Artist Program awards the Prize.

 1974: (none)
 1975: Murray Perahia, Lynn Harrell
 1976–1977: (none) 
 1978: Yo-Yo Ma
 1979: Emanuel Ax
 1980: Richard Goode
 1981: (none)
 1982: Horacio Gutiérrez
 1983: Elmar Oliveira
 1984–1985: (none)
 1986: Richard Stoltzman
 1987: (none)
 1988: André Watts
 1989–1990: (none)
 1991: Yefim Bronfman
 1992–1993: (none)
 1994: Garrick Ohlsson
 1995–1998: (none)
 1999: Sarah Chang, Pamela Frank, Nadja Salerno-Sonnenberg
 2000: Edgar Meyer, David Shifrin
 2001: Midori Gotō
 2002–2003: (none)
 2004: The Emerson String Quartet
 2005–2006: (none)
 2007: Joshua Bell
 2008: Gil Shaham
 2009–2010: (none)
 2011: Kronos Quartet
 2012–2013: (none)
 2014: Jeremy Denk
 2015–2016:: (none)
 2017: Claire Chase
 2018: Leila Josefowicz
 2020: Anthony McGill

References

External links
 Article on The Avery Fisher Prize and The Emerson String Quartet

American music awards
Classical music awards
Awards established in 1975
1975 establishments in New York City